Abu Baker Al Siddique is a rapid transit station on the Green Line of the Dubai Metro in the Deira area of Dubai, UAE.

The station opened as part of the Green Line on 9 September 2011.

The station is close to the Hamarain Centre and the KIMS Medical Center. The station is also close to a number of bus routes. Beyond this station, the metro line goes underground.

See also
 Abu Bakr (name)

References

Railway stations in the United Arab Emirates opened in 2011
Dubai Metro stations